Grjothovden is a mountain in Lom Municipality in Innlandet county, Norway. The mountain is surrounded by several other notable mountains including Kvitingskjølen to the west; Veslekjølen, Skarvhøi, and Ilvetjørnhøi to the northwest; Gråvåhø to the north; Saukampen to the east; Liaberget to the southeast; and Heranoshøi to the south.

See also
List of mountains of Norway

References

Lom, Norway
Mountains of Innlandet